Free were  an English rock band formed in London in 1968 by Paul Rodgers (lead vocals), Paul Kossoff (guitar), Andy Fraser (bass, piano) and Simon Kirke (drums, percussion). They are best known for their hit songs "All Right Now" and "Wishing Well". Although renowned for their live shows and non-stop touring, their studio albums did not sell very well until their third, Fire and Water (1970), which featured the massive hit "All Right Now". The song helped secure them a place at the 1970 Isle of Wight Festival, where they played to an audience of 600,000 people. In the early 1970s they became one of the best-selling British blues rock groups; by the time they disbanded, they had sold more than 20 million records worldwide and had played more than 700 arena and festival concerts. "All Right Now" remains a staple of R&B and rock, and has been entered in ASCAP's "One Million" airplay singles club.

Free disbanded in 1973; lead singer Paul Rodgers went on to help found and front the more successful rock supergroup Bad Company, which also featured his Free bandmate Simon Kirke on drums. Guitarist Paul Kossoff formed Back Street Crawler in 1973, but died from a pulmonary embolism at the age of 25 in 1976. Bassist Andy Fraser formed Sharks.

Rolling Stone has referred to the band as "British hard rock pioneers". The magazine ranked Rodgers No. 55 in its list of the "100 Greatest Singers of All Time", and Paul Kossoff at Number 51 in its "100 Greatest Guitarists of All Time". Free were signed to Island Records in the UK and A&M Records in North America.

History

Formation, early years and breakthrough 
Paul Kossoff and Simon Kirke first became friends in the R&B band Black Cat Bones, but they wanted to move on. Kossoff saw vocalist Paul Rodgers singing with the band Brown Sugar while visiting the Fickle Pickle, an R&B club in London's Finsbury Park. He was immediately impressed and asked if he could jam with Rodgers onstage. Along with Kirke, they began the search for a fourth member. Alexis Korner recommended Andy Fraser to the band, who had already been playing with John Mayall & the Bluesbreakers. Korner also provided the name "Free" to the newly formed band.

The group played their first gig on 19 April 1968 at the Nag's Head pub, which was at the junction of York Road and Plough Road in Battersea, London. All members were relatively young. Bass player Andy Fraser was 15 years old, lead guitarist Paul Kossoff was 17, and both lead singer Paul Rodgers and drummer Simon Kirke were 18. By November of that year they had recorded their first album, titled Tons of Sobs, for Island Records, although it was not released until the following year. The album documents their first six months together and contains studio renditions of much of their early live set. To promote their forthcoming debut album they also opened some gigs at the end of 1968 for the Who, who played a short theatre tour with Arthur Brown. The group's second studio album, Free, was recorded and released in 1969 on Island Records.

Unlike their previous albums, Tons of Sobs and Free, their album Fire and Water, released in 1970, was a huge success largely due to its hit single "All Right Now", which reached No. 2 on the UK singles chart and No. 4 on the US Billboard Hot 100. The album reached No. 2 in the UK charts and No. 17 on the U.S charts, making it the most successful Free album. "All Right Now" became a No. 1 hit in over 20 territories and was recognised by ASCAP in 1990 for garnering 1,000,000 plus radio plays in the US by late 1989. In 2000 an award was given to Paul Rodgers by the British Music Industry when "All Right Now" passed 2,000,000 radio plays in the UK. 

In July 1970 the band, despite their name, were the only advertised band to decline to perform for free for the ailing Phun City festival - according to promoter Mick Farren they "heard the deal and fucked off without even getting out of the car." Kirke's replacement in Black Cat's Bones, Phil Lenoir, played the festival as drummer for Shagrat.

Highway was their fourth studio album, recorded extremely quickly in September 1970. Highway performed poorly in the charts, reaching No. 41 in the UK and No. 190 in the US.

First break-up, reformation, and final break-up 
The band disbanded in 1971 because of differences between Fraser and Rodgers, who felt he was not being listened to. This led to the release of the live album called Free Live! In early 1972 the band set aside their differences and reformed in an effort to save Kossoff from his growing drug addiction, and released Free at Last in June of the same year.

Fraser left the band in mid-1972, frustrated by Kossoff's unreliability at being able to perform at shows or even at showing up. The remaining members recruited Japanese bass player Tetsu Yamauchi and keyboardist John "Rabbit" Bundrick, who had worked with Kossoff and Kirke during Free's initial split, recording Kossoff, Kirke, Tetsu and Rabbit and recorded what would be Free's final album, Heartbreaker. Kossoff was replaced by ex-Osibisa guitarist Wendell Richardson for a USA tour in 1973, but shortly thereafter Free disbanded for good. Rodgers and Kirke went on to form Bad Company, Fraser formed Sharks and later the Andy Fraser Band, and Kossoff formed Back Street Crawler.

After Free 
With Kossoff in better health again in late 1975, he was delighted that ex-colleagues Rodgers and Kirke asked him to join them on stage for two nights. A British tour was set to begin on 25 April 1976 with Back Street Crawler headlining with Bad Company in support of Back Street Crawler's second album, but again Kossoff's drug addictions contributed to a drastic decline in the guitarist's health. On a flight from Los Angeles to New York City on 19 March 1976, Kossoff died from a pulmonary embolism at the age of 25.

After parting with Bad Company in 1982, Rodgers went on to explore the heavy blues stylings of Free again in his solo career during the 1980s and 1990s, and in the bands The Firm and The Law. Subsequently, he teamed up as vocalist with two of the three remaining members of Queen (Brian May and Roger Taylor). In September 2008, Queen + Paul Rodgers released their first studio album The Cosmos Rocks. Rodgers also performed Free and Bad Company songs whilst on tour with Queen, in addition to the traditional Queen songs and new cuts from their most recently released album.

Rodgers and Kirke toured again with Bad Company from 2012 to 2016. Andy Fraser died on 16 March 2015. In 2017, Paul Rodgers embarked on a Free Spirit UK Tour in May 2017 to celebrate the music of Free by performing songs strictly from the Free catalogue. In 2019 Bad Company reformed to tour in support of the first leg on Lynyrd Skynyrd's Last Of The Street Survivors Tour.

Personnel

Original members
 Paul Rodgers – vocals (1968–1971, 1972–1973), keyboards, piano (1972), lead guitar (1972), rhythm guitar (1972–1973)
 Paul Kossoff – lead guitar (1968–1971, 1972, 1972–1973; died 1976)
 Andy Fraser – bass guitar, rhythm guitar, keyboards, piano (1968–1971, 1972; died 2015)
 Simon Kirke – drums, percussion (1968–1971, 1972–1973)

Later members
 John "Rabbit" Bundrick – keyboards, piano, backing vocals (1972—1973)
 Tetsu Yamauchi – bass guitar (1972–1973)
 Wendell Richardson – lead guitar (1973)

Timeline

Discography

Tons of Sobs (1969)
Free (1969)
Fire and Water (1970)
Highway (1970)
Free at Last (1972)
Heartbreaker (1973)

See also
 List of 1970s one-hit wonders in the United States

References

External links

 Free official website
Free official Facebook page
Free official YouTube channel
 ARN Official Free Website
 Planet Mellotron album reviews
 January 1973 concert review
 Free – Molten Gold: The Anthology website 
 
 

 
1968 establishments in England
1971 disestablishments in England
1972 establishments in England
1973 disestablishments in England
Musical quartets
Musical groups from London
English blues rock musical groups
English hard rock musical groups
British rhythm and blues boom musicians
Musical groups established in 1968
Musical groups disestablished in 1971
Musical groups established in 1972
Musical groups disestablished in 1973
A&M Records artists
Island Records artists
Articles which contain graphical timelines
Paul Rodgers